

Chronological list of stations

References

External links

Transport in Turin
Turin